Lagos Real Fake Life is a 2018 Nigerian comedy film directed by Mike Ezuruonye. The film stars Nollywood actors and actress such as Nedu Wazobia, Mercy Aigbe, Nonso Diobi, Annie Idibia, IK Ogbonna, MC Lively, Efe Irele including Canadian-born Ghanaian actress, Hailliote Sumney. The film portrays the artificial lifestyles lived by certain individuals who visit or reside in Lagos, mostly youths.

Production
The film was produced by Swift Angel Production, and its total production budget was put at over 30 million naira.

Plot
The film is based on true life sceneries, showing both true and fake lifestyles lived by some residents and visitors to the city of Lagos, Nigeria.

Cast
 Nedu Wazobia
 Mercy Aigbe
 Nonso Diobi as Emeka
 Annie Idibia
 IK Ogbonna
 MC Lively
 Efe Irele
 Mike Ezuruonye as Chidi
 Rex Nosa
 Uzee Usman as Amina's brother
 Odunlade Adekola
 Mr. Jollof
 Josh2Funny as Okirika cloth seller
 Hailliote Sumney
 Hadiza Gabon as Amina
 Nikky Ufondu
 Emmanuella
 Mong Kalu
 Peggy Henshaw

Reception
The film was listed by The Cable as one of the top 10 movies for viewership over the weekend. Some critics view the movie as being poorly acted and produced; others, however, praised it for showcasing diversity and conveying a comic relief. By November 2019, the movie had already made it to Netflix.

Release
Its director, Mike Ezuruonye, announced that the film would be released on February 16, 2018 to all cinemas in Nigeria. The movie was premiered at Palm Mall, Lekki, Lagos on November 16, 2018.

References

External links
 Lagos Real Fake Life on Netflix
 Lagos Real Fake Life on Australian Classification

2018 films
English-language Nigerian films
2018 comedy-drama films
Films set in Lagos
2010s English-language films
Nigerian comedy-drama films